Elachista pollutissima is a moth of the family Elachistidae. It is found in Turkey.

References

pollutissima
Moths described in 1880
Endemic fauna of Turkey
Moths of Asia